Turks in Moldova are Turkish people who live in Moldova even though having been born outside Moldova, or are Moldovan-born, but have Turkish roots. By Turkish roots, this could mean roots linking back to Turkey, the island of Cyprus or the communities of the Turkish diaspora.

Facts and figures 
According to Moldova figures, the number of residents born in Turkey is steadily increasing (note that these figures do not include the Moldova born Turks):

See also  

Moldova–Turkey relations
Gagauz people
Islam in Moldova

References

Bibliography 
 
.

Moldova
Moldova
Ethnic groups in Moldova
Moldova–Turkey relations
Muslim communities in Europe